Jennifer Troncy (born 26 January 1986 in Bagnols-sur-Cèze) is a French rugby union player. She was a member of the squad that won their fourth Six Nations title in 2014. She was selected as a member of the France women's national rugby sevens team to the 2016 Summer Olympics.

References

External links
 

1986 births
Living people
People from Bagnols-sur-Cèze
French female rugby union players
Rugby sevens players at the 2016 Summer Olympics
Olympic rugby sevens players of France
France international rugby sevens players
Female rugby sevens players
Sportspeople from Gard
France international women's rugby sevens players